"Chicken" is a song by English rock band The Eighties Matchbox B-Line Disaster, released as the fourth single from their debut album Hörse of the Dög. It was played often on MTV Rocks (formerly MTV2 Europe) and Kerrang! TV. The cover of the single features artwork by Buzz Parker, creator of Emily Strange. The song was used in Nike's May 2012 commercial My Time Is Now.

Track listing

CD single 1
Chicken
Turkish Delights of the Devil
Horse of the Dog
Chicken (video)

CD single 2
Chicken
Palomino's Dream (by The Boogs)
Sacred Metal
Palomino's Dream (by The Boogs) (Video)

6-track promo
Chicken
Palomino's Dream (by The Boogs)
Turkish Delights of the Devil
Sacred Metal
Horse of the Dog
Lazy Bones (Giant bones demo)

Video
The video comprises the band being unpacked from boxes and fridges by two crazed men in a dark room. The bodies are then attached to meat hooks and taped to their instruments. The two men look on excitedly as the band play. Chickens are seen walking around the floor of the room.

References

2003 singles
The Eighties Matchbox B-Line Disaster songs
2002 songs
Island Records singles